Axis of Justice: Concert Series Volume 1 is a live CD/DVD by various artists in support of the Axis of Justice organization.

Track listing

Audio: (Excerpts from The Axis Of Justice radio network)
Interview with Michael Moore
Interview with Janeane Garofalo
Rants and raves with Serj And Tom

Personnel

CD

1. Where the Streets Have No Name
 Performed By:
 Flea (Bass)
 Brad Wilk (Drums)
 Tom Morello (Acoustic Guitar)
 Pete Yorn (Guitar/Vocals)
 Tim Walker (Electric Guitar)
 Serj Tankian (Vocals)
 Maynard James Keenan (Vocals)
 Jonny Polonksy (Keyboards)

2. (What's So Funny 'Bout) Peace, Love and Understanding
 Performed By: 
 Chris Cornell
 Maynard James Keenan

3. Alice in My Fantasies
 Performed By:
 Flea (Bass)
 Brad Wilk (Drums)
 Tom Morello (Guitar)
 Pete Yorn (Guitar)
 Serj Tankian (Vocals)

4. Piano Improvisation
 Performed By:
 Serj Tankian

5. Charades
 Performed By:
 Serj Tankian (Vocals/Piano)

6. Until the End
 Performed By:
 The Nightwatchman

7. I Feel Good Again
 Performed By:
 Pete Yorn (Vocals/Guitar)
 Simon Petty (Acoustic Guitar)
 Tim Walker (Lead Guitar/Pedal Steel)
 Malcolm Cross (Drums/Percussion/Piano)
 Sid Jordan (Bass/Piano)
 Joe Mora (Guitar)

8. Get Up, Stand Up
 Performed By:
 Serj Tankian (Vocals)
 Tom Morello (Guitar/Vocals)
 Wayne Kramer (Guitar/Vocal)
 Flea (Bass)
 John Dolmayan (Drums)

9. Union Song
 Performed By:
 The Nightwatchman

10. (Free Jam)
 Performed By:
 Flea (Bass)
 Brad Wilk (Drums)
 Serj Tankian (Piano)

11. What's Golden
 Performed By:
 Jurassic 5

12. Freedom
 Performed By:
 Jurassic 5

13. Speak on It
 Performed By:
 Knowledge
 Serj Tankian

14. Chimes of Freedom
 Performed By:
 Tom Morello (Guitar/Vocals)
 Serj Tankian (Piano/Vocals)
 Pete Yorn (Guitar/Vocals)
 Flea (Bass)
 Brad Wilk (Drums)

15. Jeffrey Are You Listening?
 Performed By:
 Serj Tankian (Words/Melodica)
 Tom Morello (Guitars)
 Brad Wilk (Drums)
 Brian O'Conner (Bass)

 Tracks 1, 3-7, 9-14 Recorded live at Axis Of Justice Concert Series at The Avalon, Hollywood, CA, by Howard Karp and assisted by Ronny Mikkelsen on 7/19/04
 Track 2 Recorded live @ Lollapalooza, Seattle, WA, on 8/23/03
 Track 8 Recorded live @ The Axis Of Justice Concert Series at The Troubadour, Hollywood, CA on 3/31/04 by Bobby Crown
 Track 15 Recorded at Serjical Strike Studios, 2004
 Produced By Serj Tankian
 All Audio Mixed by David Bianco
 Street Audio Mixed at Scream Studios, Studio City, CA except Tracks 2, 15 (Mixed at Mad Dog Studios, Burbank, CA)
 Assistant Engineer at Scream Studios: Alex "Odd Jobs" Uychocde
 5.1 Audio Mixed at Mad Dog Studios, Burbank, CA
 Assistant Engineer at Mad Dog Studios: Rafael Serrano
 Mastered at Oasis Mastering, Studio City, CA
 Mastered by Eddy Schreyer
 Art Direction and Design by Brandy Flower
 Photograph by Jim Wright, Kevin Estrada, Hampig Koulayan, George Tonikian, Darren Doane

DVD

1. Airplane Skit
 Performed By:
 Ahmed Ahmed (Spoken Word, Comedian)

2. President Evil
 Performed By:
 Knowledge (Spoken Word)

3. Speak on It
 Performed By:
 Knowledge (Spoken Word)
 Serj Tankian (Piano)

4. Until the End
 Performed By:
 The Nightwatchman

5. The Road I Must Travel
 Performed By:
 The Nightwatchman (Acoustic Guitar/Vocals)
 Serj Tankian (Piano)
 Pete Yorn (Acoustic Guitar)
 Brad Wilk (Drums)
 Jonny Polonsky (Bass)

6. Piano Improvisation
 Performed By:
 Serj Tankian

7. Charades
 Performed By: 
 Serj Tankian (Vocals/Piano)

8. (Free Jam)
 Performed By:
 Flea (Bass)
 Brad Wilk (Drums)
 Serj Tankian (Piano)

9. Chimes of Freedom
 Performed By:
 Tom Morello (Guitar/Vocals)
 Serj Tankian (Piano/Vocals)
 Pete Yorn (Guitar/Vocals)
 Flea (Bass)
 Brad Wilk (Drums)

10. Alice in My Fantasies
 Performed By:
 Flea (Bass)
 Brad Wilk (Drums)
 Tom Morello (Guitar)
 Pete Yorn (Guitar)
 Serj Tankian (Vocals)

11. Where the Streets Have No Name
 Performed By:
 Flea (Bass)
 Brad Wilk (Drums)
 Tom Morello (Acoustic Guitar)
 Pete Yorn (Guitar/Vocals)
 Tim Walker (Electric Guitar)
 Serj Tankian (Vocals)
 Maynard James Keenan (Vocals)
 Jonny Polonsky (Keyboards)

12. Bomb Day in Paris
 Performed By:
 Wayne Kramer (Spoken Word and Guitar)
 Flea (Bass)
 John Dolmayan (Drums)

13. 5 Million Ways to Kill a CEO
 Performed By:
 Boots Riley (Vocals)
 Tom Morello (Acoustic Guitar)

14. Improvizational Noise
 Performed By:
 Serj Tankian

15. Get Up, Stand Up
 Performed By:
 Serj Tankian (Vocals)
 Tom Morello (Guitar/Vocals)
 Wayne Kramer (Guitar/Vocal)
 Flea (Bass)
 John Dolmayan (Drums)

 Recorded live at Axis Of Justice Concert Series at The Avalon, Hollywood, CA, on 7/19/04
 Bonus Footage Recorded Live at The Axis Of Justice Concert Series at the Troubadour, Hollywood on 3/31/04
 An XDOANEX Production
 Directed by J. Graf
 Produced by Darren Doane
 Executive Producers: Serj Tankian and Tom Morello
 DVD Design Billy Maddox II

References

Charity albums
2004 live albums
2004 video albums
Live video albums
Albums produced by Serj Tankian
Serjical Strike Records live albums